Jobe Township is an inactive township in Oregon County, in the south of the U.S. state of Missouri.

Jobe Township has the name of Eli , an early settler.

References

Townships in Missouri
Townships in Oregon County, Missouri